The 1905 County Championship was the 16th officially organised running of the County Championship, and ran from 4 May to 4 September 1905. Yorkshire won their seventh championship title, while the previous season's winners, Lancashire, finished in fourth place. The number of participants was expanded from fifteen to sixteen, with Northamptonshire gaining first-class status, having previously played with some success in the Minor Counties Championship.

Table
 One point was awarded for a win, and one point was taken away for each loss. Final placings were decided by dividing the number of points earned by the number of completed matches (i.e. those that ended in a win or a loss), and multiplying by 100.
 The tied match did not count as a finished match for working out the percentage.

Records

Batting

References

1905 in English cricket
County Championship seasons
County